The TURKPA in full, the Parliamentary Assembly of Turkic States, is an international organization comprising some of the Turkic countries. It was founded on 21 November 2008 in Istanbul. The General Secretariat is in Baku, Azerbaijan. The member countries are Azerbaijan, Kazakhstan, Kyrgyzstan and Turkey. Since June 2014, Hungary is an observer.

History
The Parliamentary Assembly of Turkic States (TURKPA) was established on November 21, 2008, according to the Agreement signed by the Heads of parliaments of the Republic of Azerbaijan, Republic of Kazakhstan, Kyrgyz Republic, and the Republic of Türkiye in the «Dolmabakhche Saray» located in Istanbul, Turkey. On September 29, 2009, the first plenary session of the Parliamentary Assembly of Turkic States (TURKPA) was conducted in the capital of the Republic of Azerbaijan Baku city. The TURKPA Regulations, Articles of Secretariat and Baku Declaration, and Statement regarding the permanent accommodation of the Secretariat in Baku city were adopted at the plenary session. The TURKPA Chairmanship annually hands over from one country to another by means of rotation in the English alphabetical order. The TURKPA Secretariat is the authority located in the capital of the Republic of Azerbaijan Baku city and has the status of international organization.

Mission and objectives
Since 2010, TURKPA missions observe presidential and parliamentary elections and referendums in its member countries – Azerbaijan, Kazakhstan, Kyrgyzstan and Turkey. The mission includes members of the parliament of TURKPA member states, as well as representatives of the TURKPA Secretariat. TURKPA observers' mission holds meetings with high-ranked officials of the Central Election Commission and government officials. TURKPA mission monitors voting process at all stages - visits polling stations, estimates the preparation process, has conversation with voters and representatives of the polling station, meets with the officials and representatives of political and public organizations.

The observers follow the objectivity, justness, transparency and impartiality principles confirmed in Code of Conduct for International Observers approved in 2005 by the United Nations Organization, recommendations of Venice Commission of the Council of Europe and other international legal instruments. Observation missions hold press conferences on the conclusions of the elections and referendums.

TURKPA has four permanent commissions:
Commission on Legal Affairs and International Relations (merged in 2014)
Commission on Social, Cultural and Humanitarian Affairs
Commission on Economic Cooperation (renamed from "Economic, Trade and Financial Affairs")
Commission on Environment, Natural Resources and Health Protection (created in 2014 as Environment and Natural Resources)

Main goals 
•	Assistance in development of political dialogue between the countries by means of parliamentary diplomacy as the qualitatively new stage of inter-parliamentary cooperation;

•	Harmonization of the legislations and strengthening mutual activities with regard to other issues relating to the parliamentary cooperation on the basis of historical, cultural, and language unity.

•	Assistance in development of solidity of mutually advantageous and equal cooperation between the Turkic nations and countries of other regions;

•	Recommendation on approximation of legislations of the countries, including legislation on preservation and transfer to the future generations of cultural heritage and values of history, art, literature and other areas which are of importance for Turkic states;

•	Assistance in development of political, socio-economic, cultural, humanitarian, legal, and other relations among the parties;

The Parliamentary Assembly of Turkic States selected as its primary goals the principles of independence; sovereignty; territorial and state boundaries integrity; legal equity; mutual respect grounded on the principle of non-interference in internal affairs of each other; strengthening of political and economic security of the countries on the grounds of refrainment from threat or use of force or economic or any other pressure; growth of national prosperity by means of full and rational use of natural resources; endeavour to the new progress in the sphere of parliamentary diplomacy, establishment of new relations and development of the existing ones with parliaments and other international organizations of the countries in the region and all over the world.

Affiliated bodies and organizations

The Organization of Turkic States functions as an umbrella organization for all other cooperation mechanisms like:
the Organization of Turkic States (general secretariat, Istanbul)
the International Organization of Turkic Culture (TURKSOY) (administrative capital, Ankara)
International Turkic Academy (administrative capital, Nur-Sultan)
Turkic Culture and Heritage Foundation (administrative capital, Baku)
Center of Nomadic Civilizations (administrative capital, Bishkek)
Turkic Business Council (administrative capital, İstanbul)

International cooperation
TURKPA is an observer at the following organizations.
 Parliamentary Union of the OIC Member States (PUIC)
 Inter-Parliamentary Union (IPU)
 Association of Secretaries General of Parliaments (ASGP)
 Parliamentary Assembly of the Black Sea Economic Cooperation (PABSEC)
 Conference on Interaction and Confidence-Building Measures in Asia (CICA)
 Asian Parliamentary Assembly (APA)

Members

Current

Observer states

Additionally, Parliamentary Union of the OIC Member States (PUIC) and Parliamentary Assembly of the Black Sea Economic Cooperation (PABSEC) are observers of TURKPA.

List of Secretaries-Generals and Chairmen of TURKPA
Secretary-General of TURK-PA is elected for four-year terms. Presidency is rotated in every plenary session alphabetically. Chairpersons of National Assemblies becomes ex officio chairman of TURKPA.

See also
World Turks Qurultai

References

External links
Official website
Text of the Istanbul Agreement

International organizations based in Asia
Azerbaijan–Turkey relations
Azerbaijan–Kazakhstan relations
Azerbaijan–Kyrgyzstan relations
Kazakhstan–Kyrgyzstan relations
Kazakhstan–Turkey relations
Kyrgyzstan–Turkey relations
Organizations based in Baku
Intergovernmental organizations
Post-Soviet alliances
2009 establishments in Azerbaijan
Organizations established in 2009
Political organizations based in Azerbaijan
Organization of Turkic States